Jason Cortlund (born Jason Colacicco in Oakland, California, USA) is a director, writer and producer. He studied writing and film at the University of Oregon, received a master's degree in screenwriting from the University of Texas, and was a postgraduate fellow at the James Michener Center for Writers.

Filmography
 1997 : "Texas Pawn," Producer
 2000 : "SuperDoll,"  Producer
 2002 : "Nightstand," Producer, Editor, Director, Writer
 2005 : "Once and Future Asshole," Producer
 2006 : "Interstate (part one),"  Director, Producer, Editor, Cinematographer
 2007 : "Interstate (part two),"  Director, Editor, Cinematographer
 2010 : Daylight,  Script supervisor
 2012 : Now, Forager,  Writer, Director, Actor
 2017 : Barracuda,  Writer, Director 
 2023 : Crookedfinger,  Writer, Director,

References

Living people
Year of birth missing (living people)